David F. Martin is an art historian with a primary focus on female, gay or Asian-American artists.  He is an authority on the art of Washington State during the period 1890-1960, and in particular on members of the Seattle Camera Club, and chiefly composed of Japanese American photographers working in the Pictorialist style.

Career
Martin has been the consulting curator for the Cascadia Art Museum in Edmonds, Washington since 2015. He has previously served as Program Director for the American Art Council at the Seattle Art Museum and as regional President of the Northwest Chapter of the National Museum of Women in the Arts, Washington, D.C. He is the only male Honorary Member of Women Painters of Washington.  He has been instrumental in recovering the artistic legacies of Washington State artists Virna Haffer and Soichi Sunami, among others.

Bibliography
Books he has authored or co-authored include:

References

Living people
21st-century American historians
21st-century American male writers
Year of birth missing (living people)
American male non-fiction writers